Rivière-à-Pierre station is a railway station in Rivière-à-Pierre, Quebec, Canada. It serves Via Rail's Montreal–Jonquière train. It is located on Rue Principale (Main Street), and is staffed.

External links

Transport in Capitale-Nationale
Via Rail stations in Quebec
Buildings and structures in Capitale-Nationale